Old Saint Louis is an unincorporated community in Haw Creek Township, Bartholomew County, in the U.S. state of Indiana.

History
Old Saint Louis was founded in 1836.

Geography

References

Unincorporated communities in Bartholomew County, Indiana
Unincorporated communities in Indiana
1836 establishments in Indiana
Populated places established in 1836